James Moffat Douglas (May 26, 1839 – August 19, 1920) was a farmer, missionary and politician from western Canada.  He served as MP for a district in the NWT from 1896 to 1904 and as Canadian Senator from 1906 to 1920.

The son of John and Euphemia (Moffat) Douglas, he was born and received his early education in Linton, Bankhead, Roxburghshire in Scotland, and came with his parents to settle on a small farm near Cambray, Ontario, in 1851.

Douglas was elected to the House of Commons of Canada for the district of Assiniboia East in the 1896 Federal Election. He defeated William McDonald, who had been acclaimed as the riding's Member of Parliament in the previous election. Douglas won under the Liberal Party of Canada banner, but also had strong backing from the local farmers' organization, the Patrons of Industry.

In 1900, he was re-elected to represent the district. He retired in 1904.

Douglas was appointed to the Senate of Canada to represent the province of Saskatchewan on the advice of Prime Minister Wilfrid Laurier on March 8, 1906. He served in the Canadian Senate affiliated as an Independent Liberal until his death on August 19, 1920.

Douglas built a homestead in the Qu'Appelle Valley in 1904. He named it Tantallon because he said the location reminded him of Tantallon Castle in Scotland. Tantallon takes its name from the homestead.

References

External links
 Encyclopedia of Saskatchewan

1839 births
1920 deaths
Canadian Presbyterian ministers
Canadian Presbyterians
Canadian senators from Saskatchewan
Liberal Party of Canada MPs
Members of the House of Commons of Canada from the Northwest Territories